Óscar López Águeda (born April 7, 1973), known simply as Óscar López, is a Spanish politician serving as the 12th Moncloa Chief of Staff since 2021.

He was Spokesperson for the Spanish Socialist Workers' Party (Socialist Group) at the Senate between 2015 and 2016.

References

1973 births
Living people
People from Madrid
Spanish Socialist Workers' Party politicians
Members of the 8th Cortes of Castile and León